Pierluigi Piccini (born 10 November 1952 in Rome) is an Italian politician.

Biography
Piccini started his political career as a municipal councillor for the Italian Communist Party in Siena in 1988. He was elected Mayor of Siena on 29 November 1990 after the resignation of mayor Vittorio Mazzoni della Stella. He joined the Democratic Party of the Left in 1991 and was re-elected on 21 June 1993. He ran for a new term at the 1997 Italian local elections and was confirmed as Mayor of Siena on 28 April 1997.

He was expelled from the Democrats of the Left in 2004. He ran again for the office of mayor as an independent, supported by local civic lists, in 2006 and in 2018, failing both elections.

See also
1993 Italian local elections
1997 Italian local elections
2006 Italian local elections
2018 Italian local elections
List of mayors of Siena

References

1952 births
Living people
Mayors of Siena
Democrats of the Left politicians
Italian Communist Party politicians
Democratic Party of the Left politicians